Ghoria nigripars is a moth of the family Erebidae. It is found in eastern India and China (Shaanxi, Zhejiang, Fujian and Guangdong).

References

Moths described in 1856
Lithosiina
Moths of Asia